is a national university in Japan. The main campus is located in Miné-machi, and the engineering campus at Yōtō, in Utsunomiya, Tochigi Prefecture.

History 

The university at first had two faculties: Faculty of Agriculture (in Mine Campus) and Faculty of Liberal Arts (in Takaragi Campus).
1955: The Faculty of Liberal Arts was removed to Mine Campus.
1964:  was merged with the university to constitute Faculty of Engineering (in Yoto Campus).
1966: The Faculty of Liberal Arts was renamed Faculty of Education.
1994: The Faculty of International Studies was added.

Faculties (Undergraduate Schools) 
 Faculty of International Studies
 Department of International Social Studies
 Department of International Cultural Studies
 Faculty of Education
 School Teachers' Training Course
 Lifelong Education Course
 Environmental Education Course
 Faculty of Engineering (in Yoto Campus)
 Department of Mechanical Systems Engineering
 Department of Electrical and Electronic Engineering
 Department of Applied Chemistry
 Department of Architecture and Civil Engineering
 Department of Information Science
 Department of Optical Engineering
 Faculty of Agriculture
 Department of Bioproductive Science
 Department of Environmental Engineering
 Department of Agricultural Economics
 Department of Forest Sciences

Graduate Schools 
 Graduate School of International Studies (Master's/Doctoral)
 Graduate School of Education (Master's courses only)
 Graduate School of Engineering (Master's/Doctoral)
 Graduate School of Agriculture (Master's/Doctoral)
 The doctoral courses belong to the Joint Graduate School of Agriculture by Tokyo University of Agriculture and Technology, Ibaraki University and Utsunomiya University.

References

External links 

 
 Utsunomiya University Youtube Official Channel 

Educational institutions established in 1922
Japanese national universities
Universities and colleges in Tochigi Prefecture
Forestry education
1922 establishments in Japan